The Bellarine Football Netball League (BFNL) is an Australian rules football and netball competition based in the Bellarine Peninsula region of Victoria, Australia. Established in 1971 as the Bellarine & District Football League, the competition was formed out of the ashes of the Polwarth Football League, which had six of its former teams join.

The competition was renamed the Bellarine Football League in 1986, and finally the Bellarine Football Netball League in 2011 when the local netball competition was administratively aligned with the football competition for the first time. Prior to 2011, netball clubs competed in a competition overseen by the Bellarine District Netball Association.

The BFNL forms the second tier of football in the Geelong area, along with the Geelong Football League and the Geelong & District Football League.

Clubs

Current clubs

Former clubs

Premiers

Senior football

A Grade netball

Individual awards

Senior football

Les Ash Medal 
The Les Ash Medal, named after a longtime Bellarine administrator, is presented to the league's best and fairest player at the conclusion of the home-and-away season. It was first named after Ash in 1989; previously it was known simply as the best and fairest medal. Two players have won the award on four occasions – Modewarre's Josh Finch, whose honours spanned seven seasons throughout the 2010s, and Torquay's James Darke, the most recent medallist. Both Finch and Darke are also members of a group of five players who have won the award in consecutive seasons.

Leading Goalkicker Award 
The Leading Goalkicker Award is presented to the player who has kicked the most goals at the conclusion of the home-and-away season. Barwon Heads' Stephen "Chooka" Piec, described as "a poster boy for the Bellarine in its formative years", holds the record for the most titles (four). The magical century-mark of goals has been reached 14 times throughout the regular season. Dominant Torquay forward Wayne Tyquin's three-year run of 349 cumulative goals from 1997 to 1999 capped off a five-year consecutive period where the league had at least one centurion. Overlap between the Leading Goalkicker Award and the Les Ash Medal is rare; only two players (Torquay's Mark Browne in 1986 and Geelong Amateur's Mitch Day in 2015) have collected both honours in the same season.

A Grade netball

Best & Fairest Award

Hot Shot Award

Bibliography
 Cat Country - History of Football In The Geelong Region - John Stoward -

Notes

References

External links
 
 Bellarine Football League at AustralianFootball.com
 Leopold Lions (information about former teams)
 Football Geelong (information on home grounds and colours)
 Geelong & District Football League (information on Winchelsea FC)

 
Australian rules football competitions in Victoria (Australia)
Sport in Geelong
1971 establishments in Australia